Marcelo Melo and Bruno Soares were the defending champions, but Soares chose to compete in Vienna instead.  Melo was scheduled to play alongside Ivan Dodig, but withdrew due to an abdominal injury.
Aisam-ul-Haq Qureshi and Jean-Julien Rojer won the title, defeating Jonas Björkman and Robert Lindstedt in the final, 6–2, 6–2.

Seeds

Draw

Draw

References
 Main Draw

Thailand 

If Stockholm Open - Doubles
2012 Doubles